The J.A. Neaville House is a historic house at the northeast corner of Arkansas Highway 385 and Len Avenue in Griffithville, Arkansas.  It is a -story wood-frame structure, with weatherboard siding and a brick foundation.  It has Craftsman styling, with doghouse dormers in the roof, and a broad screened porch under the roof, whose rafter ends are exposed. The core portion of the house was built in 1899, and was enlarged and restyled in 1917.

The house was listed on the National Register of Historic Places in 1992.

See also
National Register of Historic Places listings in White County, Arkansas

References

Houses on the National Register of Historic Places in Arkansas
Houses completed in 1899
Houses in White County, Arkansas
National Register of Historic Places in White County, Arkansas
1899 establishments in Arkansas
American Craftsman architecture in Arkansas
Bungalow architecture in Arkansas